Peter Noever (born 1 May 1941) is an Austrian designer and curator–at–large of art, architecture and media. From 1986 to 2011 he was the artistic director and CEO of MAK—Austrian Museum of Applied Arts and Contemporary Art in Vienna.

Life 
Noever was born in Innsbruck. In 1971 he founded a concept store in Vienna, called “Section N”. The building was designed by Hans Hollein.

From 1975 to 1993 Noever worked as a lecturer of design analysis at the Academy of Fine Arts, Vienna. In 1982 he founded an architecture magazine titled UMRISS (Outline); he was From 1989 he was publisher and editor-in-chief of UMRISS, which lasted until 1994.

From 1986 to 2011 Noever was Artistic Director and C.E.O. of the MAK (Austrian Museum of Applied Arts / Contemporary Art), based in Vienna.

From 1988 to 1989 he was visiting professor of museology at the Academy of Applied Arts, Vienna. Since 1997 Peter Noever he has belonged to the “Kurie für Kunst und Wissenschaft”, the most prestigious award for science and arts in Austria.

In 1994 Noever founded the MAK Center for Art and Architecture, with its Schindler Artists and Architects-in-Residence Program in West Hollywood (Los Angeles), adding to it the MAK program UFI – Urban Future Initiative in 2010. The activities of the MAK Center in Los Angeles take place at three locations, all buildings designed by the pioneering Austrian-American architect Rudolph M. Schindler (1887–1953). The third Schindler building, the Fitzpatrick-Leland House on Mulholland Drive, was entrusted to Peter Noever in 2008 as a donation of film producer Russ Leland for the MAK Center in Los Angeles. Noever also initiated and artistically oversaw the renovation of the Kings Road House (Schindler House) in West Hollywood and the Mackey Apartments (which are used for the residency program). In 2010, he also—together with architects Michael Ferguson and Kirby Smith (Space International Inc.)—completed the Mackey Apartments’ new garage structure including the “Garage Top.”

2006 Founding of the Josef Hoffmann Museum, Brtnice, a joint branch of the Moravian Gallery in Brno and the MAK Vienna.

As an exhibition creator, Noever has conceived and/or curated over 350 exhibitions in Vienna as well as in Los Angeles, Venice, New York, Moscow, Tokyo, Berlin, Prague, Brtnice, Budapest, Shenzhen (China), St. Petersburg, Havana, and elsewhere.

The MAK satellite project CAT – Contemporary Art Tower (with artistic interventions by Jenny Holzer and James Turrell) for the flak tower at Vienna's Arenberg Park could not be fully realized. 

Golden Lion for the Best National Participation at the 2014 Venice Biennale of Architecture for Crow's Eye View: The Korean Peninsula. Peter Noever was part of the curatorial exhibition team of (South) Korea.

Peter Noever has overseen placement of over 20 sculptures in the public space and/or staged temporary public space interventions in Vienna, Los Angeles, and Venice. Most recently: Zaha Hadid, Trompe l’Oeil at the Winter Palace (City Palace) of Prince Eugene at the Belvedere, Vienna, 2015.

2014–2016 “Vienna for Art’s Sake!” and “Germany mon amour!” Archives of contemporary art (Austria and Germany) curated for Luciano Benetton's collection “imago mundi”.

Peter Noever lectures at main universities and art institutions around the world. He lives and works in Vienna together with the jurist and cultural manager Elisabeth Noever-Ginthör. Together they have a daughter, Louisa Vita Noever. His daughter from his first marriage, Ixy Nova Noever, is ethnologist, film maker and university lecturer at the University of applied arts Vienna.

Exhibitions and lectures (selection) 

 2019: exhibition project „Obsessions in Focus. Confrontations, Experiences, and Glowing Friendships“, April–May, SCI-Arc, Southern California Institute of Architecture, Los Angeles.
 In 2019 exhibition project „Germany, mon Amour!“ / Imago Mundi/Luciano Benetton, Athens.
 Vadim Kosmatschof „Sculpture“, The New Tretyakov Gallery, Moscow, Russia, 2018, Peter Noever curated together with Kirill Svetlyakov and Anna Mapolis.
 exhibition „declared_“, Peter Noever / Andrea Lenardin. Design as an interface between cultural diversity and global challenge in a time of dramatic political exclusion. Gallery Rauminhalt Vienna, 2018
 "Vienna For Art's Sake ! Contemporary Art Show", created by Peter Noever; 161 exceptional artists, architects, designers, 13 solo exhibitions / site-specific interventions: Vito + Maria Elena Acconci, Zaha hadid, Magdalena Jetelová, Michael Kienzer, Hans Kupelwieser, Hermann Nitsch, Eva Schlegel, Kiki Smith, the next ENTERprise, Iv Toshain, Atelier Van Lieshout, Koen Vanmechelen, Manfred Wakolbinger; Winter Palace/Belvedere Wien; starting point: Imago Mundi/Luciano Benetton Collection, Archive Austria, curated by Peter Noever, Wien, 2015
 "Crow’s Eye View: The Korean Peninsula", Golden Lion for Korean Pavilion, Peter Noever member of the curatorial team, 14. Architecture Biennale, Venice, 2014
 "Vienna For Art's Sake ! Archiv Austria", curated by Peter Noever; 161 outstanding artworks, collection Luciano Benetton, Vienna, 2014
 key note lecture and workshop at 2nd sunhoo industrial design & creativity festival, hangzhou, zhejiang province, china September 22–24, 2012
 Birgit Jürgenssen Award 2012, jury–member, academy of fine arts, Vienna
 "the (secret)* return of no/ever", exhibition at Ace Museum, exhibition committee: , Frank Gehry, Greg Lynn, Jeffrey Kipnis, Eric Owen Moss, Thom Mayne, Wolf Prix, exhibition designer: Alexis Rochas; Los Angeles, 2011/2012
 "Koen Vanmechelen. Modified Spaces", exhibition curated by Peter Noever, Guangzhou Triennial, Guangdong Museum of Art, China, 2011
 "Walter Pichler. Sculptures Models Drawings", curated by Peter Noever/Bärbel Fischer, MAK Vienna, 2011/2012
 "artworks on site / glasstress 2011", curated by Peter Noever, artists: Erwin Wurm, Michael Kienzer, Magdalena Jetelova, Koen Vanmechelen, Kendell Geers, Zaha Hadid; 54. Art Biennale Venice, Palazzo Cavalli Franchetti, 2011
 "Koen Vanmechelen. Nato a Venezia", curated by Peter Noever, 54. Art Biennale Venedig, Palazzo Loredan, 2011
 competition NYC/EDC illuminate lower manhattan, “place making through lighting initiative”, New York
 guest lecture and member of the “2nd SUNHOO International design forum”, Hangzhou, China
 ART curated by ... presentation and video-clip, “the open university of diversity”, Hasselt, Belgium
 disappearance art museum without art, lecture at the international congress “the history and future of art and design museums”, Bundeskunsthalle Bonn, Germany
 contemporary art territory 21 a radically new strategy for up–to–date art institutions, Los Angeles / Guangzhou / Vienna, SCI Arc, Los Angeles
 mind the gap lecture, Kaneko, Open Art Space, Omaha, Nebraska
 why not? Vienna – Pyongyang, a manifestation of art between worlds, lecture, national gallery, Pyongyang / DPRK
 NOW lecture at Studio Greg Lynn, Institute of Architecture, University of Applied Arts, Vienna
 Design as Strategy guest lecture at first e.co-design festival in Hangzhou, China
 Cosmos of Art lecture at NCCA – National Centre for Contemporary Arts, Moscow, Russia
 Architecture meets Art. Manifestation for the here and now. Lecture together with Koen Vanmechelen, Guangdong Museum of Art, Guangzhou, China
 Out of the Blue. A radically new strategy for up-to-date art institutions Los Angeles / Guangzhou / Vienna. Lecture at the Forum of the 4th Guangzhou Triennial, China
 For the 5th Biennale di Architettura in Venezia, 1996 Peter Noever's land art project "The Pit" was selected by Günther Feuerstein (commissioner of the Austrian Pavilion). At the 7th Biennale di Architettura, 2000 in Venice he was Juror together with Dejan Sudjic, Charles Correa et al.;  2010 at the 12th Biennale di Architettura work of his was selected for the Austrian Pavilion and together with Hernan Diaz Alonso, Wolf D. Prix and Eric Owen Moss he joined the Panel Discussion upon the opening of the Austrian Pavilion.

Guest lecturer at various international universities in Europe, the US and Asia (selection) 

In 2016 Peter Noever has been nominated as a possible candidate for the position of dean of the School of the Arts and Architecture of the University of California (UCLA), Los Angeles. 

Muncie, Indiana / Havana, Cuba / Cheboksary, Chuvashia, Russia / Kanazawa, Japan / Moscow, Russia / Kiev, Ukraine / Zurich, Switzerland / Prague, Czech Republic / Budapest, Hungary / Belgrade, Serbia / Nicosia, Cyprus / New York and Los Angeles
Editor and author of numerous books, magazines and other publications on art, media, design and architecture.

Publications 

 "Germany, mon amour ! Contemporary in Germany. Archive Art Architecture Design. Curated by Peter Noever. Publication featuring more than 200 outstanding artists, architects, designers.", 520 pages, Publisher: imago mundi, Luciano Benetton Collection, Italy, 2016.  
 "Reflections on Zaha Hadid" with a contribution by Peter Noever; published by Serpentine Galleries / Hans Ulrich Obrist, London, 2016
 "Representing Force", Eliyahu Keller, Harvard University Graduate School of Design, May, 2016; featuring The Havana Project / Lebbeus Woods; published 2016
 "Vienna For Art's Sake ! Archive Austria / Contemporary Art. curated by Peter Noever", 161 artists, architects, designers. edited by FABRICA, imago mundi, Luciano Benetton Collection, Italy, 2014. 381 pages. 
 Peter Noever, "chronisch obsessiv. Die Gegenwart muss erst erkämpft werden". edited by Gabriel Ramin Schor, introduction by Herbert Lachmayer; Verlag für moderne Kunst Nürnberg, 2008. 780 pages. .
"design now © - what if...?", edited by Peter Noever, Vienna, no/ever–design art edition, 2012. 
"nato a venezia - Koen Vanmechelen / open university of diversity", 54. Biennale di Venezia, edited by Peter Noever, 2011
"the [secret] return of no/ever", exhibition catalog, ACE Museum, Los Angeles, SCI-Arc, 2011
"Austria Dawaj!", edited by Martina Kandeler-Fritsch / Percept Peter Noever, Verlag für moderne Kunst Nürnberg, 2011. 
"Dawaj! Russian Art Now. Aus dem Laboratorium der freien Künste in Russland", edited by Peter Noever and Joachim Sartorius, Hatje Cantz, 2002. 
"design now ©", edited by Peter Noever, Vienna, no/ever–design art edition, 2011. 
"Walter Pichler", edited by MAK Vienna, Jung & Jung, Salzburg/Wien, 2011
"Blumen für Kim Il Sung / Kunst und Architektur aus der Demokratischen Volksrepublik Korea", edited by Peter Noever, Verlag für moderne Kunst Nürnberg, 2010. 
"In The Absence of Raimund Abraham / Vienna Architecture Conference 2010", edited bys Peter Noever / Wolf D. Prix, 2010. 
Gerhard Johann Lischka "World-Image-Cult-Spots.10", edited by Peter Noever, Vienna, MAK, 2010.  (Studio Noever verified by email that the ISBN is 978-3-900688-96-6.  Unfortunately, it produces a checksum error.)
Thomas Feichtner, "Edge to Edge", edited bys Peter Noever, Shonquis Moreno, Lilli Hollein, Bernhard E. Bürdek, Michael Hausenblas. 2010, MAK, Birkhäuser Verlag, Basel-Boston-Berlin. 
Boris Groys, "Museum In The Media - Media In The Museum", edited by Peter Noever, Vienna, MAK, 2009
"20/21. MAK Sammlung Gegenwartskunst", edited by Peter Noever, Verlag für moderne Kunst Nürnberg, 2009. 
"Julius Deutschbauer / Gerhard Spring. Nur 100 Plakate", edited by Peter Noever, 2008. 
Beat Wyss, "On Today’s State Of Art", edited by Peter Noever, Vienna, MAK, 2008. The ISBN printed in the document (978-900688-85-0) is bad; it consists of 12 digits, not the required 10 or 13.
"Coop Himmelb(l)au. Beyond The Blue", edited by Peter Noever, Prestel Verlag München, 2007/08. 
"Padhi Frieberger. Ohne Künstler keine Kunst!", edited by Peter Noever, 2007. 
"Jenny Holzer. XX", edited bys Peter Noever, Schlebrügge edited by, Vienna, 2006.  
"Günther Domenig. Structures That Fit My Nature", edited by Peter Noever, MAK Center Los Angeles, 2005.
"Lebbeus Woods. System Wien", edited by Peter Noever, Hatje Cantz Verlag, 2005. 
"Otto Mühl, Leben, Kunst, Werk: Aktion, Utopie, Malerei 1960–2004", edited by Peter Noever with Otto Mühl (Illustrations) and Éric Alliez, for the exhibition at the MAK 2004, König Köln 2004, 
"Elke Krystufek. Liquid Logic. Height Of Knowledge And The Speed Of Thought", edit. Peter Noever, 2006. 
"Zwischen Bild und Realität", edited by Ralf Konersmann, Peter Noever, Peter Zumthor. ETH Zürich, 2006. 
"References To The Undefined. - Art. The Artists. The Art Museum", edited by Peter Noever, Vienna, MAK, 2004. 
"Zaha Hadid. Architecture", edited by Peter Noever, Hatje Cantz Verlag, 2003. 
"Carlo Scarpa. the craft of architecture/Das Handwerk der Architektur", edited by Peter Noever, with texts by Tadao Ando, Roberto Gottardi, Arala Isozaki and Giovanni Antodilo; Hatzje Cantz Verlag, 2003; 
"Architectural Resistance. Contemporary architects face Schindler today", edited by Peter Noever, MAK Los Angeles, manifests by Coop Himmelb(l)au, Christophe Cornubert/PUSH, Odile Decq + Bernoit Cornette, Günther Domenig, driendl architects, Durfee/Regn, Eichinger oder Knechtl, Eisenman architects, Zaha M. Hadid, Sandrine von Klot, Andrea Lenardin Madden, Mack architect(s), Eric Owen Moss architects, the next enterprise architects, Dominique Perrault + Cyril Lancelin, Roto architects, Berhard Sommer, Klaus Stattmann, Michael Volk, Lebbeus Woods; Hatje Cantz Verlag, 2003. 
"Donald Judd. Architecture - Architektur", edited by Peter Noever, Hatje Cantz Verlag, 1991. 2. Auflage 2003. 
"Franz West. Gnadenlos", edited by Peter Noever, Hatje Cantz Verlag, 2001. 
"Museums Without Future", edited by Peter Noever, Vienna, MAK, 2001. 
"James Turrell. The Other Horizon", edited by Peter Noever, 2001. 
"das diskursive museum", edited by Peter Noever, Hatje Cantz Verlag, 2001. 
"Frederick J. Kiesler. Endless space", edited by Dieter Bogner and Peter Noever, MAK Center, Los Angeles, 2000/01, Hatje Cantz Verlag, 
"Heaven's Gift / CAT Contemporary Art Tower", edited by Peter Noever, Hatje Cantz Verlag, 2000
"Visionary Clients For New Architecture", edited by Peter Noever, portrayals of Frederick Samitaur Smith, Rolf Fehlbaum, Thomas Krens; Prestel Verlag, 2000. 
"Jannis Kounellis. Il Sarcofago Degli Sposi", edited by Peter Noever, Hatje Cantz Verlag, 1999. 
"El Proyecto Habana. Architectura otra vez", edited by Peter Noever, with an introduction by Fidel Castro Ruz, Prestel Verlag München, 1999. 
"Architecture. Works by Gordon Matta-Clark", edited by Peter Noever, Los Angeles, 1998. 
"Chris Burden. Beyond the limits", edited by Peter Noever, Hatje Cantz Verlag, 1996. 
"Kunst im Abseits?/art in the center. documenta X", edited by Peter Noever, talks with Catherine David, Peter Kogler, Elke Krystufek, Peter Pakesch, Gerwald Rockenschaub, Franz West, Robert Fleck, Jean Francois Chevrier, Mike Davis, Mike Kelly, Peter Noever, Jeff Wall; Hatje Cantz Verlag. 
"Vienna/Milano Cityguide. Basicdesign. XIXth Triennale di Milano", edited by Peter Noever, Springer Verlag, Wien/New York, 1996. 
"Tyrannei des Schönen. Architektur der Stalin-Zeit", edited by Peter Noever, 1994, Prestel Verlag München. 
"Peter Noever. Upstairs Down", edited by Peter Noever und Storefront New York, 1994. 
"Peter Noever. Ein Stein für die Kunst./A Rock for the arts. The MAK-terrace plateau in Vienna", edited by MAK, Hatje Cantz Verlag, 1994. 
"Vito Acconci. The City Inside Us", edited by Peter Noever, 1993. 
"austria im rosennetz / Eine Ausstellung von Harald Szeemann", edited by Peter Noever and Kunsthaus Zürich, 1992/93. 
"Magdalena Jetelová. Domestizierung einer Pyramide", edited by Peter Noever, 1992. 
"Kiki Smith. Silent Work", edited by Peter Noever, 1992. 
"The end of Architecture? Vienna Architecture Conference", edited by Peter Noever, architectural positions by Coop Himmelb(l)au, Zaha Hadid, Steven Holl, Thom Mayne, Eric Owen Moss, Carme Pines, Lebbeus Woods, Prestel Verlag, 1992. 
"Peter Noever. die grube/the pit", photographic documentation, edited by Kristin Feireiss/Galerie and Architekturforum Aedes, Berlin, 1991. 
"Architecture in transition. Between deconstruction and new modernism", edited by Peter Noever, with contributions by Coop Himmelb(l)au, Peter Eisenman, Zaha Hadid, Daniel Libeskind, Morphosis, Jean Nouvel, Michael Sorkin, Bernard Tschumi, Lebbeus Woods and Philip Johnson; Prestel Verlag, 1991. 
"Rodschenko. Stepanova. The future is our own goal", edited by Peter Noever, Prestel Verlag München/New York, 1991. 
"Peter Noever. Wiener Architekturgespräche", edited by Elisabeth Schweeger, Verlag Ernst und Sohn Berlin, 1991. 
"Peter Noever. die grube/the pit", edited by Kristin Feireiss/Galerie and Architekturforum Aedes, Berlin, 1991. 
"Christian Reder. Ein Museum im Aufbruch", edited by Peter Noever, 1991. . 
"Walter Pichler. Skulptur", edited by Peter Noever, Resident Verlag, Salzburg/Wien, 1990. 
"Carlo Scarpa. the other city. die andere stadt", edited by Peter Noever; with texts by Philippe Duboy, Regina Haslinger, Luciano Benetton; Willhelm Ernst & Sohn, Berlin. 
"Land in Sicht. Österreichische Kunst im 20. Jahrhundert", edited by Peter Noever, Verlag Ernst und Sohn Berlin. Austrian Federal Ministry for Arts and Education Vienna. Ministry for Culture and Education Budapest. Mücsarnok, Budapest. 1989, . 
"Günther Domenig, das Steinhaus: Ausstellung im Österreichischen Museum für Angewandte Kunst, Wien, 10. November 1988 bis 9. Jänner 1989", edited by Günther Domenig, Peter Noever, Raimund Abraham, MAK, 1988, 
"Das Riegersburger Kochbuch", edited by Peter Noever; with contributions by Peter Kubelka and Johannes Wieninger, ORAC Verlag, 1988. 
"Kunst und Revolution/Art and Revolution. Russische und sowjetische Kunst 1910-1932", edited by the Culture Ministry of the USSR, Katalin Néray, Mücsarnok, Budapest and Peter Noever, MAK, 1988. 
"Tradition und Experiment. Das österreichische Museum für angewandte Kunst", edited by Peter Noever, Residenz Verlag Salzburg, 1988. 
"Bernard Rudofsky. Sparta/Sybaris", edited by MAK, Residenz Verlag, Salzburg, 1987, 
 editor of the architectural magazine "Umriss", 1982–94, Institut für Informationsentwicklung/Center for Understanding Media. Under Peter Noever's editorship, from 1987 with Elisabeth Schweeger

Committees and memberships 
 Archiv Franz West, Vienna, board member
 Roland Rainer Komitee Vienna, board member
 STEINHAUS Günther Domenig Privatstiftung, Steindorf/Austria; board members: Adolf Rausch, Peter Noever, Hannes Pflaum
 Schusev State Museum of Architecture, Moskau; corresponding member

Decorations and awards
 1991: PAN prize for best exhibition creator, Frankfurt am Main
 1996: Museum of the Year Award of the Council of Europe, Strasbourg, at the MAC
 1997: Austrian Decoration for Science and Art (highest decoration of the Republic of Austria for superior creative and commendable services in the areas of the sciences or the arts)
 2010: Gold Medal for services to the City of Vienna
 2014: participation as exhibition creator for the Korean Pavilion: Golden Lion, 14th Venice Biennale of Architecture
 2015: Georg Heindl cultural award (previous award winners e.g. Christoph Ransmayr, Brigitte Kowanz and Franz Graf), Vienna

External links

References 

Living people
1941 births
Artists from Innsbruck
Austrian art curators
Recipients of the Austrian Decoration for Science and Art
Businesspeople from Innsbruck